GDNF-inducible zinc finger protein 1 is a protein in humans that is encoded by the GZF1 gene.

References

Further reading 

Human proteins